Shri Satish Kumar Sharma is a politician from the Indian National Congress party who is a Member of the Parliament of India, representing Madhya Pradesh in the Rajya Sabha, the upper house of the Indian Parliament.

External links
 Profile on Rajya Sabha website

Indian National Congress politicians
Living people
Rajya Sabha members from Madhya Pradesh
Rajya Sabha members from Uttar Pradesh
Year of birth missing (living people)
Indian National Congress politicians from Madhya Pradesh
Indian National Congress politicians from Uttar Pradesh